Phaesticus mellerborgi is a groundhopper found in China, Indo-China and Malesia, now placed incertae sedis the Tetrigidae.

See also
Discotettix adenanii
Discotettix selangori
Scelimena hafizaii
Scelimena razalii
Gavialidium phangensum

References

Insects of Malaysia
Orthoptera of Asia
Tetrigidae